The Uppsala University Coin Cabinet (Uppsala universitets myntkabinett) is one of Sweden's most important public coin and medal collections. It is housed in  the main building of Uppsala University.

History
The history of the collection goes back to the 17th century. In total, it comprises close to 40,000 objects.
Archives items  include  coin dating back to the sixth century BC to modern digital currencies. The collections of older Swedish coins and medals are especially important, together with the collections of coins from the Viking age, early modern European coins and Islamic coins. 
The coin cabinet is principally focused on supporting research and education at Uppsala University. Therefore, only a very representative fraction of the collections can be viewed in exhibitions. The main exhibition of coins and medals from the Middle Ages. The first numismatic thesis at Uppsala University was published in 1679. Since then,  various dissertations have been written in numismatics and monetary history.

See also
History of money
History of coins

References

Other sources
 Elsa Lindberger   (2006) Anglo-Saxon and later British Coins (Oxford University Press) 
 Peter Berghaus,  Hendrik Mäkeler  (2006) Deutsche Münzen der Wikingerzeit sowie des hohen und späten Mittelalters ( Uppsala:  Studia Numismatica Upsaliensia)

External links 
 Uppsala University Coin Cabinet website
 Uppsala University Coin Cabinet Online Catalogue

Uppsala University
Numismatic museums in Sweden
University museums in Sweden
Museums in Uppsala